Gascon cattle is a breed of cow.  Two different types of this breed of cattle are: à muqueuses noires and aréolé. These were combined in 1955 into a single herdbook, but in 1999 they were once again made two different breeds.

Characteristics
The Gascon have many characteristics that make them different from any other breed of cattle. For example, their hard coat enables the Gascon to tolerate cold weather better than other cows; it is also very thick and sheds water well. The ease of calving is another. Gascon cows have a much shorter labour than other breeds. Another characteristic of the Gascon is that their calves get stronger and gain more weight faster than other types of cows.

Gascon cows have lower feed consumption than other types of cows. This is due to adaptation as their food sources are often scarce. However, they are still able to keep in good condition and become pregnant easily. Gascon cows have a gray coat, but are born red -- the coat changes colour at about the fourth month of life. Bulls are gray, with black shading underneath. Mature cows weigh 550 to 700 kg and stand 135 cm at the shoulder; bulls average 145 cm in height and 800 to 950 kg in weight.

History
Gascon cattle were originally bred in the French Pyrenees, where the harsh climate and limited resources led to the adaptations found in this breed. Because of these adaptations, Gascon cattle can survive and work hard in basically any condition. Because they spend their winters in the low lands and their summers high on the Pyrenees, they are used to huge changes in the climate.

See also
Pyrénées-Atlantiques
Cattle
Dairy cattle
Beef cattle
Livestock

References

Cattle breeds originating in France
Cattle breeds